Reino Paasilinna (5 December 1939 – 21 July 2022) was a Finnish politician who served as a Member of the European Parliament (MEP). He was a member of the Social Democratic Party of Finland, which is part of the Party of European Socialdemocrats. He was in the European Parliament from 1996 to 2009, and sat on the Parliament's Committee on Industry, Research and Energy.

Reino Paasilinna was born on Aunus, a ship on the Arctic Ocean, on the coast of Norway, where the Paasilinna family fled during the Winter War. His family is from Petsamo but they moved to Kittilä because the Soviet Union invaded Petsamo during the Winter War.

He was also a substitute for the Committee on Culture and Education, vice-chair of the delegation to the EU–Russia Parliamentary Cooperation Committee, and a substitute for the delegation for relations with the countries of Central America.

The writers Erno, Mauri and Arto Paasilinna were his brothers.

Career 
 Master's degree in social sciences (1974)
 postgraduate degree in social sciences (1989)
 doctorate in social sciences (1995)
 Various occupations (1951–1961)
 TV journalist, director and editor (1961–1974)
 Press secretary and adviser at the Finnish embassies in Moscow and Washington, D.C. (1974–1983)
 Director-General (last) and Chairman of Yleisradio (1990–1994)
 Chairman, Union of Radio and Television Journalists (1967–1969)
 Member of the board and Vice-chairman of Elisa Communications (1988–2002)
 Member, Helsinki City Council (1998–1999)
 Member of Parliament (1983–1989 and 1995–1996)
 Vice-chairman, Committee on the Future (1995–1996)
 Member of the European Parliament (since 1996)
 Chairman, PSE Group Working Party on the Information Society (since 1998)
 Member of Finland's delegation to the Council of Europe (1995–1996)
 Vice-chairman, International Radio and Television Organisation and Vice-chairman, European Broadcasting Union (1992–1994)
 Chairman, Board of Governors of Euronews (1992–1994)
 Member, Inter-Parliamentary Union (IPU) (1983–1989)
 Numerous publications, TV programmes and articles
 Commander of the Order of the Lion of Finland (1995)

References

External links 
 European Parliament biography
 

1939 births
2022 deaths
People born at sea
Social Democratic Party of Finland MEPs
MEPs for Finland 1996–1999
MEPs for Finland 1999–2004
MEPs for Finland 2004–2009
Commanders of the Order of the Lion of Finland
Finnish television journalists
People from Kittilä